Captain James Cook (1728–1779) was a British explorer, navigator, and mapmaker.

Captain Cook may also refer to:

Arts, entertainment, and media
 Captain Cook (book), a 1972 book by Alistair MacLean
 "Captain Cook" (Blackadder), an episode of the British TV series Blackadder Goes Forth
 Captain Cook, the first penguin in the children's book Mr. Popper's Penguins

People
 Alastair Cook (born 1984), English cricketer
 Henry Cooke (composer) (c. 1616 – 1672), also known as Captain Cook, English composer, choirmaster and singer
 Samuel H. Cook, Union officer of the American Civil War

Fictional characters 

 Jesse Pinkman, alias and license plate "CAPNCOOK"

Places
 Captain Cook, Hawaii, a town in Hawaii, U.S.
 Captain Cook State Recreation Area, a state park on the Kenai Peninsula, Alaska, U.S.
 Captain Cook Bridge, New South Wales, Australia
 Captain Cook Bridge, Brisbane, Australia

Ships
 Captain Cook (1826 ship)

Other uses
 Callistemon 'Captain Cook', a plant cultivar
 The Hotel Captain Cook, a hotel in Anchorage, Alaska built by Wally Hickel

See also
Captain Hook (disambiguation)